The National Television Council ( or CNTV) is a Chilean government agency whose function is to oversee the operation of television services.

It was first created by Law 17377 on October 24, 1970.
Its existence is formalized in the Constitution of Chile, with its composition, organization, and powers defined in Law 18838 of 1989 and Law 19131 of 1992.

Since 2001, it has participated in creating the contents of CNTV Infantil, an educational channel for cable television.

Composition

1970—1989 
After the passage of Law 17377 in 1970, the Council was composed of:
 The minister of public education, who acted as the president of the Council.
 A representative of the president of the Republic, of his free choice.
 Three representatives, not members of Congress, elected by the Senate, in a single election where each member had a single vote and the three parties with the highest vote total were elected.
 Three representatives, not members of Congress, elected by the Chamber of Deputies in the same manner as above.
 Two representatives of the Supreme Court, selected by it.
 The rector of the University of Chile.
 The rector of the Pontifical Catholic University of Chile.
 The rector of the Pontifical Catholic University of Valparaíso.
 The president of the board of directors of Televisión Nacional de Chile.
 A representative of the workers of Televisión Nacional and another of the workers of the three existing university channels (Canal 9, Canal 13 and UCV Televisión).

Decree Law 113 of October 29, 1973, modified the composition of the Council by eliminating the representatives of the Senate and the Chamber of Deputies (due to the dissolution of the National Congress after the coup d'état of September 11) and the representatives of the workers of TVN and the university channels.

1989—1992 
Law 18838 of September 30, 1989, established that the Council be composed of:
 The president of the Council, appointed by the president of the republic with the consent of the Senate.
 A representative of the president of the republic, of his free choice.
 A representative of the Supreme Court, appointed by the latter, and who has served as minister of the court or lawyer of the same.
 Two representatives of the commanders-in-chief of the Armed Forces and the general director of the Carabineros.
 Two representatives of Chilean universities, appointed by their rectors. The rectors of those universities that, directly or indirectly, were concessionaires of television services could not participate in the appointment of directors.

1992 to the present 
Currently, after the reforms introduced by Law 19131 of 1992, the CNTV must be composed of 11 members, one of whom, appointed by the president of the republic, presides over the Council. The rest are designated by agreement of the Senate. The directors must be persons of relevant personal and professional merits. In addition, the law requires pluralism both in the selection of directors and in the functioning of the body.

Current members (as of September 2019) 
 Catalina Parot (president)
 Genaro Arriagada
 María Elena Hermosilla
 Andrés Egaña
 Gastón Gómez
 Hernán Viguera
 Esperanza Silva
 María de los Ángeles Covarrubias
 Marigen Hornkohl
 Mabel Iturrieta

Presidents 
 Alfonso Márquez de la Plata (September 30, 1989April 20, 1992)
 José Joaquín Brunner (April 20, 1992September 20, 1994)
 Pilar Armanet (October 10, 1994April 12, 2000)
 Bernardo Donoso (April 12, 2000May 7, 2001)
 Patricia Politzer (May 7, 2001March 27, 2006)
 Belisario Velasco (June 19, 2006July 13, 2006)
 Jorge Navarrete Martínez (August 31, 2006December 17, 2010)
 Herman Chadwick (December 17, 2010September 8, 2014)
 Óscar Reyes (September 8, 2014April 11, 2018)
Catalina Parot (April 11, 2018)

Criticism and controversies 
Due to its power, the Council has been accused of being an archaic, conservative and obsolete body for modern times. Lately, it has also been accused of censoring content on television.

References

External links 
 Official website of CNTV (Spanish)
 Frequently Asked Questions about CNTV (Spanish)
 Complaints to CNTV (Spanish)
 CNTV Infantil (Spanish)

Government agencies of Chile
1970 establishments in Chile
Government agencies established in 1970
Television in Chile
Television organizations